Gédéon Rochon (1877 – February 11, 1917) was a lawyer and political figure in Quebec. He represented Terrebonne in the House of Commons of Canada from 1915 to 1917 as a Conservative.

He was born in Saint-Jérôme, Quebec, the son of David Rochon and Célina Nantel, and was educated at the Séminaire de Sainte-Thérèse and the Université Laval. Rochon was called to the Quebec bar in 1902 and practised law at Saint-Jérôme. In 1909, he married Victorine Prévost. He was elected to the House of Commons in a 1915 by-election held after his uncle Wilfrid Bruno Nantel was named Railway Commissioner. Rochon died in office in Saint-Jérôme at the age of 40.

Another uncle Guillaume-Alphonse Nantel also served in the House of Commons.

References

Members of the House of Commons of Canada from Quebec
Conservative Party of Canada (1867–1942) MPs
1877 births
1917 deaths
People from Saint-Jérôme
French Quebecers